"Deliver Me" is a song originally released by The Beloved in 1996.  In 1998, Sarah Brightman covered the song on her album Eden. It was a European only single. A second version was released as a charity single in aid of the 1999 Chi-Chi earthquake victims.

Track listing

European CD
"Deliver Me"
"Dust in the Wind"

Taiwan Benefit CD
"Deliver Me"
"Nella Fantasia"
"Deliver Me" (CD-ROM Video)

Cover versions
 The Christian rock band David Crowder Band covered the song on their 2003 album Illuminate.
 Sister Bliss (of Faithless fame) covered the song as a single in 2001 in numerous countries, reaching #31 in the UK singles chart. It also featured backing vocals and guitar from folk hero John Martyn.

Uses in other media
The song was used at the ending of the 1999 film Brokedown Palace.

A cover of the song was used in a New Zealand television advert for Steinlager beer

References

External links
'Deliver Me - Sarah Brightman' Review on ICELIA 

1999 singles
Sarah Brightman songs
Songs written by Helena Marsh
1996 songs
The Beloved (band) songs
Songs written by Jon Marsh
Song recordings produced by Frank Peterson
1990s ballads
Charity singles